Harold A. Keeling (born September 18, 1963) is an American-born Venezuelan former professional basketball player who briefly played for the Dallas Mavericks in the National Basketball Association (NBA) in the mid-1980s. Born in New Orleans, Louisiana, he attended Santa Clara University.

He was a member of the Venezuelan team during the 2001 Tournament of the Americas.

Keeling was a guest on Episode 72 of "An Eternity of Basketball," a video podcast that focuses on PBA (Philippines Basketball Association) in the 70's and 80's. On this episode outlined his playing career as:

 1981-1985 Santa Clara (College)
 1985-1986 Dallas Mavericks (NBA)
 1986 Manila Beer (the Philippines)
 1987 Guaiqueries de Margarita (Venezuela)
 1987-1989 Maccabi Ramat Gan (Israel)
 1989-1990 La Rochelle (France)
 1990-1991 Lyon Cro (France)
 1990 Marinos De Oriente (Venezuela) - CHAMPION
 1991-1992 Lyon Cro (France) - CHAMPION
 1992 Mulhouse (France)
 1993-1994 Marinos De Oriente (Venezuela) - CHAMPION
 1995 Bravos de Lara (Venezuela)
 1995 Columbia Baranquilla (Venezuela) - CHAMPION
 1996-1997 Toros de Aragua (Venezuela)
 1998-2004 Marinos De Oriente (Venezuela) - CHAMPION in 1998, 2003, and 2004

Notes

External links
NBA stats @ basketball-reference.com
Harold Keeling profile 

1963 births
Living people
American expatriate basketball people in Israel
American expatriate basketball people in Venezuela
American men's basketball players
Basketball players from New Orleans
Dallas Mavericks draft picks
Dallas Mavericks players
Marinos B.B.C. players
National Basketball Association players from Venezuela
Naturalized citizens of Venezuela
Ironi Ramat Gan players
Point guards
Santa Clara Broncos men's basketball players
Venezuelan men's basketball players
American expatriate basketball people in the Philippines
Manila Beer Brewmasters players
Philippine Basketball Association imports